The Kingdom of Kuninda (or Kulinda in ancient literature) was an ancient central Himalayan kingdom documented from around the 2nd century BCE to the 3rd century, located in the southern areas of modern Himachal Pradesh and far western areas of Uttarakhand in northern India and Doti Gadwall in Nepal.

Kingdom
The history of the kingdom is documented from around the 2nd century BCE. They are mentioned in Indian epics and Puranas. The Mahabharata relates they were defeated by Arjuna.

One of the first kings of the Kuninda was Amoghbhuti, who ruled in the mountainous valley of the Sutlej and Yamuna rivers (in today's southern Himachal and far western Uttarakhand  in northern India).

The Greek historian Ptolemy linked the origin of the Kuninda to the country where the rivers Beas, Sutlej, Yamuna and Ganges originate.

One of the Edicts of Ashoka on a pillar is also present at Kalsi, in the region of Garhwal, indicating the spread of Buddhism to the region from the 4th century BCE.

The Kuninda kingdom disappeared around the 3rd century, and from the 4th century, it seems the region shifted to Shaivite beliefs.

Coinage
There are two types of Kuninda coinage, the first one issued around the 1st century BCE, and the second around the 2nd century CE. The first coins of the Kuninda were influenced by the numismatic model of their predecessor Indo-Greek kingdoms, and incorporated Buddhist and Hindu symbolism such as the triratna and images of Lakshmi. These coins typically follow the Indo-Greek weight and size standards (drachms, of about 2.14 g in weight and 19 mm in diameter), and their coins are often found together with Indo-Greek coins in hoards, such as those of the Yaudheyas, or the Audumbaras.

The finds of Kuninda coins have often been associated with finds of Indo-Greek coins, particularly those of Appolodotus.

A very large portion of the Kuninda coins are in the name of king Amoghabhuti, and it is believed that coinage under his name continued after his death.

Some later coins of the 2nd century CE bear the symbol of the Hindu god Shiva.

Rulers
 Amoghabhuti (late 2nd century-1st century BCE)

See also
 Indo-Greek Kingdom

References

External links
 Scripts in Kuninda coinage

Empires and kingdoms of India
History of Uttarakhand
Kingdoms in the Puranas
2nd-century BC establishments
3rd-century disestablishments